This article displays the qualifying draw of the 2011 Kremlin Cup.

Players

Seeds

Qualifiers

Lucky loser
  Arantxa Parra Santonja

Qualifying draw

First qualifier

Second qualifier

Third qualifier

Fourth qualifier

References
 Qualifying draw

2011 - Women's qualifying
Kremlin Cup - qualifying